BBC Learning English is a department of the BBC World Service devoted to English language teaching.

The service provides free resources and activities for teachers and students, primarily through its website. It also produces radio programmes which air on some of the BBC World Service's language services and partner stations. It has won numerous awards, including two Eltons from the British Council and an English Speaking Union award for innovation in English language teaching.

The department was established in 1943. Since then, it has changed names multiple times, appearing as "English by Radio" (or ExR), "English by Radio and Television" and "BBC English", before arriving at "BBC Learning English".  BBC World Service began broadcasting English language teaching programmes in 1945 for beginners, intermediate and advanced learners, for adult and children. There were number of series for teaching language comprehension with a help of song lyrics, such as Pop Words. It was usual for the major broadcasters in the 1950s to have a programme teaching the language of the country the broadcaster served.

In August 2007, BBC Learning English announced a partnership with Xinjiang's Tianshannet.

References

External links

 
An example of song lyrics to aid teaching language comprehension - from "The Road to Nashville"
Language Academia
Tianshannet

1943 establishments in the United Kingdom
Learning English
English as a second or foreign language
Language-learning websites
Language education materials
British educational websites